509-E was a Brazilian rap group formed by Dexter and Afro-X when they were incarcerated in Carandiru Penitentiary. The group dissolved in 2003 when the musicians decided to follow solo careers.

Career
The group emerged in the Carandiru prison where Dexter and Afro-X shared the same cell and the gift of writing raps. Soon after the launch of the first song, "powder keg" 509-E had great success and the two artists began to produce new music. In 2000, they released their debut album,Proverbs 13, with special guests of Mano Brown, Edy Rock, MV Bill and DJ Hum. The highlight of the CD was the track "Eighth Angel", sung by Dexter.

The group was at its peak when after an interview on Rede Globo, the pair were targeted by Brazilian authorities for speaking out. After the uprising that resulted in the closing of the Carandiru penitentiary 509-E was banned from playing shows in the street by the police due to their advocacy. After a time, Afro-X won the Freedom 509-E released his second and last work,LL DC (2002 after Christ). The two members began to fall out and the group ended in 2003.

Regarding the end of the group Dexter states,

Currently, Dexter follows a solo career and has released four albums, Afro-X remained a time in rap, moved away and came back again, became nationally known for married Simony, and is currently an educator.

In 2009, it released a documentary about the 509-E, called Between Light and Shadow, directed by Luciana Burlamaqui. It investigates violence in Brazil from the formation of Dexter and Afro-X in the Carandiru. Released in theaters on November 27, 2009 in November 14 received first prize: won 4 ª Mostra Cinema and Human Rights in South America

Discography
 Provérbios 13(2000)
 MMII DC (2002 Depois de Cristo) (2002)

References

External links
 509-E at Last.fm

Brazilian hip hop groups
Musical groups established in 2000
Musical groups disestablished in 2003